Mohamed Habib Juma Mnyaa (born 2 December 1955) is a Tanzanian CUF politician and Member of Parliament for Mkanyageni constituency since 2005.

References

Living people
1955 births
Civic United Front MPs
Tanzanian MPs 2005–2010
Tanzanian MPs 2010–2015
University of Dar es Salaam alumni
Norwegian University of Science and Technology alumni
Zanzibari politicians